The Dragon Defense is a 2017 Colombian drama film directed by Natalia Santa. It was screened in the Directors' Fortnight section at the 2017 Cannes Film Festival.

Cast
Gonzalo de Sagarminaga
Hernan Mendez
Manuel Navarro
Victoria Hernandez
Maia Landaburu
Martha Leal
Laura Osma

References

External links
 

2017 films
2017 drama films
Colombian drama films
2010s Spanish-language films
2017 directorial debut films
2010s Colombian films